Dusina may refer to:

 Dusina, Poland, a village near Gostyń, Poland
 Dusina, Fojnica, a village in the municipality of Fojnica, Bosnia and Herzegovina
 Dusina (Zenica), a village in the City of Zenica, Bosnia and Herzegovina

People
 Pietro Dusina, inquisitor of Malta 1574–1575